Gurdaspur district is a district in the Majha region of the state of Punjab, India. Gurdaspur is the district headquarters. It internationally borders Narowal District of Pakistani Punjab, and the districts of Amritsar, Pathankot, Kapurthala and Hoshiarpur. Two main rivers Beas and Ravi passes through the district. The Mughal emperor Akbar is said to have been enthroned in a garden near Kalanaur, a historically important town in the district. The district is at the foothills of the Himalayas.

As of 2011 it is the third most populous district of Punjab (out of 22), after Ludhiana and Amritsar. Batala, with 31% of the district's population, is its largest city.

History

British Raj 

During British Rule the district of Gurdaspur was a subdivision of Lahore Division, the district itself was administratively subdivided into four tehsils: Gurdaspur, Batala, Shakargarh and Pathankot. According to the 1881 census the population of the district was 823,695 this had risen by over 100,000 to 943,922 in the 1891 census. However the 1901 census recorded a fall in population – 940,334, this was largely due to emigration – some 44,000 settlers settling in Chenab colony. According to the 1901 census there were 463,371 Muslims (49%), 380,636 Hindus (over 40%) and 91,756 (10%) Sikhs. Mirza Ghulam Ahmad who founded the Ahmadiyya movement had followers here.

During the partition of India in 1947 the future of Gurdaspur was highly contested. According to the 1941 census, the population of this district had a narrow 51.14% Muslim majority. Radcliffe Award of the boundary gave only the Shakargarh tehsil of the district to Pakistan, and the rest to India. The Muslim population of the eastern tehsils migrated to Pakistan as refugees, and the Hindus and Sikhs of Shakargarh migrated to Gurdaspur after crossing the Ravi Bridge. They settled and spread in the Gurdaspur district.

Inside India 
On 27 July 2011 a part of district is carved out to form a new Pathankot district, which was earlier part of Gurdaspur.  The Pathankot district comprises two sub-divisions of Pathankot and Dharkalan along with two sub-tehsils namely Narot Jaimal Singh and Bamial.

Geography

Location
The Gurdaspur district is in the north of Punjab state. It falls in the Jalandhar division and is sandwiched between rivers Ravi and Beas. The district lies between north-latitude 31°36' and 32°34' and east longitude 74°56' and 75°24' and shares common boundaries with Pathankot district in the north, Beas River in the north-east, Hoshiarpur district in the south-east, Kapurthala district in the south, Amritsar district in the south-west and Pakistan in the north-west.

Government and politics

Politics

Tehsil

Sub Tehsils (Total : 7)

C.D. Blocks (Total : 11)

Municipal Corporation (Nagar Nigam)

Municipal Councils

Villages

Demographics

Population
According to the 2011 census Gurdaspur district has a population of 2,298,323, roughly equal to the nation of Latvia or the US state of New Mexico. This gives it a ranking of 196th in India (out of a total of 640). Its population growth rate over the decade 2001–2011 was  9.3%. Gurdaspur has a sex ratio of  895 females for every 1000 males, and a literacy rate of 79.95%.

After the separation of the Pathankot tehsil into a separate district in 2011, the residual district has a population of 1,621,725 of which 1,260,572 were rural and 361,153 were urban. Scheduled Castes have a population of 373,544 (23.03%) of the population. Punjabi is the predominant language, spoken by 98.27% of the population.

Religion 
Sikhism is the largest religion in the residual district with 950,016 (58.58%), while Hinduism is the second-largest with 476,095 (29.36%). Christians are the third-largest community with 169,295 (10.44%), the highest share of Christians in the state, and Muslims 13,350 (0.82%). Before Partition, undivided Gurdaspur district had a slight Muslim majority with a large Hindu minority and smaller Sikh and Christian populations. The area which now forms the current district had a Muslim majority and a large Sikh minority, with smaller Hindu and Christian populations.

Historical

Notable people 
Dev Anand - Indian actor
Premchand Dogra - Bodybuilder, Mr. Universe, Mr. India
Capt. Gurbachan Singh Salaria - Param Vir Chakra awardee, posthumous
Chetan Anand - director
Vijay Anand - director
Vinod Khanna - Indian actor
Shiv Kumar Batalvi - Punjabi writer
Dilbagh Singh - Air Chief Marshal
Dinesh Khanna - Badminton player
Romesh Sharma - Indian Actor and producer
Jasbir Jassi - Bhangra singer
Lt. Navdeep Singh - Ashoka Chakra awardee, posthumous
Guru Randhawa - Punjabi singer
Preet Harpal - Punjabi singer and actor
Ashwani Kumar - Former Union Minister
Robert Masih Nahar - Spanish senator
Shivil Kaushik - cricketer
Teja Singh Akarpuri -  Jathedar of Akal Takht
Iqbal Bahu - Pakistani Sufi singer
Ishfaq Ahmad - Pakistani nuclear physicist
Alla Rakha - Tabla player
Nek Chand Saini - Indian artist and creator of the Rock Garden of Chandigarh
Gurpreet Ghuggi - actor and comedian-turned-politician
Ranjit Bawa - Punjabi singer and actor
Nimrat Khaira - Punjabi singer and actress
Satinder Satti - anchor-singer
Manpreet Gony - cricketer
Varinder Singh Ghuman - bodybuilder
Surjit Singh Randhawa - hockey player
Principal Sujan Singh - Punjabi writer
Teja Singh (singh sabha movement)
Prabhjot Singh (Indian hockey player)
Sobha Singh - painter
Pratap Singh Bajwa - Rajya Sabha MP from Punjab
Baba Jaimal Singh - Punjabi spiritual leader
Mirza Nasir Ahmad (Khalifatul Massih III)
Mirza Tahir Ahmad (Khalifatul Massih IV)
Mirza Ghulam Ahmad - Founder of the Ahmaddiya movement
Mirza Basheer-ud-Din Mahmood Ahmad (Khalifatul Massih II)
Ghulam Ahmed Pervez - Islamic scholar
 Mumtaz Mufti - Urdu writer
Sunanda Sharma - Punjabi singer and actress
Harnaaz Sandhu - Miss Universe 2021
AP Dhillon - Singer/songwriter, music producer

References

External links

 
Districts of Punjab, India